Åmarken station is a commuter rail railway station serving the southern part of the suburb of Hvidovre west of Copenhagen, Denmark. It is located on the Køge radial of Copenhagen's S-train network.

References

External links

S-train (Copenhagen) stations
Railway stations opened in 1972
Railway stations in Denmark opened in the 20th century